Hanigan is a surname. Notable people with the surname include:

John L. Hanigan (1911–1996), American businessman
Kylie Hanigan (born 1971), Australian sprinter
Les Hanigan (born 1945), Australian rugby player
Ryan Hanigan (born 1980), American baseball player

See also
Hannigan, a surname